InFluid Software is a video game developer and software developer (although mostly the first), established in 1996. The company is notorious for their frequent use of horror atmosphere and violence in their games. They still uphold the use of the shareware distribution model, trying to remain old school as much as possible. Smack Some Smackers was their most popular and infamous franchise and, besides Haunted Childhood II, their Internet distribution breakthrough. Nowadays, most of their games are freeware, along with the older titles, and the upcoming ones.

Games
 2002 - Gravedigger
 2003 - Haunted Childhood
 2003 - Smack Some Smackers
 2003 - Smack Some Smackers X-Mas
 2004 - Haunted Childhood II
 2004 - Bad Dreams
 2004 - Smack Some Smackers 2
 2006 - Smack Some Smackers 2 Xmas Xtreme

Old Projects
Besides the available games that are listed above, InFluid Software has created several mostly DOS based games, that are no longer listed on their site, and are considered abandoned. Most of these titles are unobtainable.
 1996 - Impedo 2000
 1996 - Pomak
 1996 - Nitemarebin
 1996 - H-Quest
 1997 - SpacePop
 1999 - InfoCraft
 1999 - Nightmare Wars
 2000 - System War

External links
 Official InFluid Software website

References

Video game companies